Religion in Montenegro refers to adherents, communities, institutions and organizations of various religions in Montenegro. While Eastern Orthodox Christianity is the dominant religious denomination in Montenegro, there are also sizable numbers of adherents of both Catholic Christianity and Islam. 

The majority of  Orthodox Christians belong to the Serbian Orthodox Church, but there are traces of a forming Montenegrin Orthodox Church which is not canonically recognized by the Orthodox Christian Church. According to the 2020 estimate by the Pew Research Center, 76.6% of the population is Christian, 19.11% are Muslims, and 2.61% are unaffiliated.

Demographics

Historical demographics

Distribution by ethnic group in 2011
The results of the Montenegrin census of 2011 by ethnic groups, the latest census in which the indication of identification (whether by confession or as irreligious) in the question for confession was obligatory, are as follows:

Christianity

Eastern Orthodoxy 

Eastern Orthodox Christianity is the dominant religion in Montenegro. Adherents of Eastern Orthodoxy in Montenegro are predominantly ethnic Montenegrins and Serbs. Ethnic Serbs of Montenegro and Montenegrins are adherents of the Serbian Orthodox Church and its dioceses in Montenegro: Metropolitanate of Montenegro and the Littoral, Eparchy of Budimlja and Nikšić, parts of Eparchy of Mileševa, and parts of Eparchy of Zahumlje and Herzegovina. Ethnic Montenegrins are divided between the Serbian Orthodox Church and the independent Montenegrin Orthodox Church (which is by the Serbian Orthodox Church and the other autocephalous Orthodox Churches, a non-canonical schismatic, heretical, and a political fabrication Orthodox church).

Catholic Church 

Most Catholics are ethnic Albanians and Croats as well as some Montenegrins.

Islam 

Muslims form the largest minority religion in the country. Montenegro's 118,477 Muslims make up 19.11% of the total population.

Muslims in Montenegro are divided into two main groups, and further subgroups:

Bosnian-speaking ethnic Bosniak Muslim
Other Slavic Muslims (ethnic Muslims), including Gorani, and other Slavs of the Muslim faith who identify by religion rather than by ethnicity. 
Albanian Muslims
Albanian-speaking ethnic Albanian Muslims
Romani people
Islam is the dominant religion in the northeastern municipalities, which are part of the Sandžak geographical region, and in municipalities where Albanians form a majority. Islam is the majority religion in Rožaje, Plav, Gusinje, Ulcinj and Petnjica.

Judaism 

Montenegro is one of a select few countries and the only one in its region where there is an enviable inter-religious fund and there is no public manifestation of anti-Semitism and general negative attitude towards the Jewish people and the state of Israel. Even more, there is a high respect for the Jewish people and its contribution to the secular civilization. In February 2012, the Prime Minister of Montenegro Igor Lukšić signed an agreement with the Montenegrin Jewish community to grant official recognition of Jews as a minority in Montenegro. The agreement also established Judaism as the country's fourth official religion, along with the Eastern Orthodox Church, Catholic Church and Islam.

Atheism 

The majority of Montenegro's population, 98.69%, declares to belong to a religion, though observance of their declared religion may vary widely.

On the census from 2011, atheists, those who declared no religion, comprised about 1.24% of the whole population, and agnostics 0.07%.

Religiosity is lowest in the Bay of Kotor region and the capital city of Podgorica. Municipalities with highest share of atheists are Herceg Novi (2.43%), Kotor (2.03%), Podgorica (1.99%) and Tivat (1.7%). In contrast, Rožaje has the fewest atheists, who make up only 0.01% of its population. In some municipalities more than half of population are undeclared, however.

Religious freedom 

Montenegro's laws guarantee the freedom of religion and outlaw several forms of religious discrimination, as well as establishing that there is no state religion in Montenegro. The government provides some funding to religious groups.

According to a 2017 survey conducted by the Council of Europe in cooperation with the Office of the Ombudsperson of Montenegro, 45% of respondents reported having experienced religious discrimination.

References

Sources

External links

 Venice Commission (2015): Draft Joint Interim Opinion on the Draft Law on Freedom of Religion of Montenegro
 Venice Commission (2019): Montenegro: Opinion on the Draft Law on Freedom of Religion or Beliefs and Legal Status of Religious Communities
 Council of Europe (2019): Montenegro: Provisions on religious property rights include positive changes to out-dated legislation, but need more clarity, says Venice Commission
 Freedom of Religion or Belief in Montenegro: Conclusions (2019)